Llanwern railway station is a former station serving Llanwern on the east side of the city of Newport.

History 
It was opened with the South Wales Railway in 1850 and closed to passengers on 12 September 1960 in preparation for the building of Llanwern steelworks. It was closed completely on 16 April 1961.

The Newport City Council unitary development plan and Sewta rail strategy plan both planned for the station to be re-opened at the same time as the main line was re-signalled by 2012. Station reopening was subsequently postponed.

Recent developments 

After the closure of the steelworks, and the construction of housing on the site, Llanwern seems likely to be under consideration for some part in a broader Severnside Parkway scheme, to relieve the pressure of commuter traffic and its parking on the village of Rogiet and Severn Tunnel Junction.

Planning permission has been requested in 2019 by Transport for Wales as part of their preliminary plans for a major events stabling line at the site. The line will be used to situate infrastructure close to demand for major occasions such as Millennium Stadium events in Cardiff, but also serve as a line for testing new Construcciones y Auxiliar de Ferrocarriles trains for Transport for Wales, to be manufactured at the nearby Celtic Springs Business Park factory. The larger scheme, including the railway station and car park, will be submitted in a later application.

See also
Railway stations in Newport
South Wales Metro
Transport for Wales
Proposed railway stations in Wales

References

Disused railway stations in Newport, Wales
Proposed railway stations in Wales
Railway stations in Great Britain opened in 1850
Railway stations in Great Britain closed in 1960
Former Great Western Railway stations